Pedro "Perico" Ojeda (born 15 November 1972 in San Luis, Argentina) is an Argentine former professional footballer who played as a forward for clubs in Argentina, Chile and Spain.

Clubs
 Gimnasia y Esgrima de Mendoza 1993–1994
 Godoy Cruz de Mendoza 1994–1996
 Coquimbo Unido 1996–1997
 Instituto de Córdoba 1997–1998
 Racing Club 1998–1999
 Numancia 1999–2003
 Talleres de Córdoba 2003
 Racing de Córdoba 2004
 General Paz Juniors 2005
 Estudiantes de San Luis 2006
 Luján de Cuyo 2006–2007
 Atlético Juventud Alianza 2007

External links
 

1972 births
Living people
Argentine footballers
Association football forwards
Gimnasia y Esgrima de Mendoza footballers
Godoy Cruz Antonio Tomba footballers
Coquimbo Unido footballers
Instituto footballers
Racing Club de Avellaneda footballers
CD Numancia players
Talleres de Córdoba footballers
Racing de Córdoba footballers
General Paz Juniors footballers
Club Sportivo Estudiantes players
Asociación Atlética Luján de Cuyo players
Chilean Primera División players
Argentine Primera División players
Argentine expatriate footballers
Argentine expatriate sportspeople in Chile
Expatriate footballers in Chile
Argentine expatriate sportspeople in Spain
Expatriate footballers in Spain
People from San Luis, Argentina